Ophichthus alleni is an eel in the family Ophichthidae. It was described by John E. McCosker in 2010. It is a marine, deep water-dwelling eel known from Australia, in the western Pacific Ocean.

The species epithet alleni refers to Gerald R. Allen.

References

Taxa named by John E. McCosker
Fish described in 2010
alleni